The Himler Coal Company was a cooperative mining company established in 1918 by Hungarian-American immigrant Martin Himler. The company was responsible for the establishment of two company towns, Himler (now Ajax), West Virginia and Himlerville (now Beauty), Kentucky. Its finances exhausted, the company was wiped out by flooding in 1928.

Himler Coal Company is remembered for its unique organizational structure, believed to be the only coal mining company ever organized on a cooperative basis.

History

Background

On May 7, 1907, the S.S. Carpathia arrived at New York City carrying among its passengers an impoverished 18-year old ethnic Jew from Hungary, Martin Himler. The youth obtained his first job working in the coal mines of Thacker, West Virginia, before taking a similar job as a miner in Iselin, Pennsylvania.

Development

Decline and demise

Legacy

Footnotes

Further reading

 Eugene S. Bagger, "Himler of Himlerville," Survey Graphic, vol. 48, no. 5 (April 29, 1922), pp. 146–150, 187.
 Doug Cantrell, "Himlerville: Hungarian Cooperative Mining in Kentucky," Filson Club History Quarterly, vol. 66, no. 4 (October 1992), pp. 513–542.
 Doug Cantrell, "Immigrants and Community in Harlan County, 1910–1930," Register of the Kentucky Historical Society, vol. 86, no. 2 (Spring 1988), pp. 119–141. In JSTOR
 J.R. Hayworth, "Hungarians Successfully Conduct Cooperative Mine in Kentucky, Having Two Million Dollars Invested," Coal Age [New York], vol. 20, no. 11 (September 15, 1921), pp. 412–414.
 Martin County Historical and Genealogical Society, A Pictorial History of Martin County, Kentucky. Paducah, KY: Turner Publishing Company, 2001.
 Tom Wallace, "Miners Will Run Own Mine: Experiment of Hungarians at Warfield, KY, Promoted by Gotham Editor," Louisville Courier-Journal, October 18, 1920, pp. 1, 7.
 Margaret Ripley Wolfe, "The Towns of King Coal," Register of the Kentucky Historical Society, vol. 97, no. 2 (Spring 1999), pp. 189–201. In JSTOR

External links
 "Our Town: Himlerville," Kentucky Educational Television, March 3, 2015. —Video.
 Doug Cantrell, "Himler, Himlerville, and a Historian's Quest," Appalachian History, www.appalachianhistory.net/ September 17, 2015.
 Cathy Cassady Corbin, "Saving the Himler House," Appalachian History, www.appalachianhistory.net/ November 10, 2014.

Mining companies of the United States
Hungarian-American history
Cooperatives in the United States